Live Is Overrated is a live album the by Swedish industrial metal project Pain. It was released in 2005 via the Metal Mind label.

Metalmania 2005
Supersonic Bitch
End of the Line
On Your Knees
Dancing with the Dead
It's Only Them
Just Hate Me
Same Old Song
Shut Your Mouth

Krzemionki TV Studio, Krakow, Poland
Greed
Breathing in Breathing Out
Suicide Machine
Nothing
Eleanor Rigby
On and On

Tavastia Club, Helsinki, Finland
Supersonic Bitch
End of the Line

Bonus video clips
End of the Line
Suicide Machine
On & On
Shut Your Mouth
Just Hate Me
Same Old Song
Bye/Die

Pain (musical project) albums
2005 video albums
Live video albums
2005 live albums